Cory Dosdall (born February 1, 1973) is a Canadian retired professional ice hockey player.

Dosdall played five seasons of major junior hockey in the Western Hockey League with the Regina Pats, Tri-City Americans, and Lethbridge Hurricanes. He began his professional career during the 1995–96 season playing in the Central Hockey League with the Wichita Thunder, where he was named the CHL Rookie of the Year. Dosdall retired from professional hockey following the 1998–99 season.

Career statistics

Awards and honours
CHL Rookie of the Year (1996–97)

External links

1973 births
Living people
Canadian expatriate ice hockey players in the United States
Canadian ice hockey centres
Ice hockey people from Saskatchewan
Lethbridge Hurricanes players
Regina Pats players
Sportspeople from Regina, Saskatchewan
Tri-City Americans players
Wichita Thunder players